Suchita Trivedi (born 20 September 1976) is an Indian actress, who is known for her work in Hindi TV dramas. She is widely remembered for her portrayal of Meenakshi Thakkar in the acclaimed dramedy Baa Bahoo Aur Baby on Star Plus, for which she twice won the Indian Telly Award for Best Actress in a Comic Role, and received two further nominations.

Personal life
Suchita was born to parents Anil Trivedi and Geeta Trivedi in Mumbai, Maharashtra on 20 September 1976. Suchita married to Nigam Patel on 22 September 2018 at the age of 42.

She shared her marriage photos on Instagram which become viral.

Career
Trivedi made her acting debut as a child artiste in the 1983 Bollywood film Woh Saat Din, starring Anil Kapoor, Naseeruddin Shah, and Padmini Kolhapure in the main roles. Her character was called Chanda.

She has mainly worked on Indian Hindi television. She is best known for portraying the comic character of Meenakshi Thakkar in Hats Off Productions' super-hit TV series Baa Bahoo Aur Baby, aired on Star Plus Hindi channel from 2005 to 2010.

Filmography

Films 
 1983 – Woh Saat Din (Debut; child artist)
 1984 - Laila (1984) (Child Artist)
 1986 - Preeti (1986 film) (Child Artist)
 1997 – ...Jayate
 2000 – Mission Kashmir – Dr Akhtar's wife
 2006 – O Re Manvaa (My Heart)
 2008 – Firaaq
 2015 – Kuch Kuch Locha Hai – Kokila Patel
 2018 – Ventilator – Gujarati film

Television

Stage
 2005 – Ishwar Ni Exchange Offer (Gujarati stage drama)

References

External links 
 
 

1976 births
Living people
Actresses from Mumbai
Gujarati people
20th-century Indian actresses
21st-century Indian actresses
Actresses in Hindi cinema
Actresses in Gujarati cinema
Actresses in Hindi television
Indian women comedians
Indian film actresses
Indian television actresses
Indian stage actresses
Indian soap opera actresses